The Castra of Ighiu was a fort made of earth in the Roman province of Dacia. Its dating is uncertain.  The traces of the one time earthwork can be identified on the Măguligici Hill in Ighiu (Romania).

Măguligici Hill

See also
List of castra

Notes

External links

Roman castra from Romania - Google Maps / Earth

Roman legionary fortresses in Romania
Ancient history of Transylvania
Historic monuments in Alba County